Formula E, officially the FIA Formula E World Championship, is an auto racing championship using fully electric single-seater cars.

Formula E may also refer to:

 Formula Enterprises, or Formula SCCA
 Formula E, a Formula Ford class with 1600 cc engines and outboard suspension
 Formula E, a 250 cc unlimited Superkart class
 Formula E, a Go-Kart track in Sunshine, Victoria which offers both petrol and electric go karts

See also
 Formula (disambiguation)
 E (disambiguation)